Subcancilla lopesi is a species of sea snail, a marine gastropod mollusk, in the family Mitridae, the miters or miter snails.

References

lopesi
Gastropods described in 1969